Benthastelena diademata is a species of sea snail, a marine gastropod mollusk, in the family Calliostomatidae within the superfamily Trochoidea, the top snails, turban snails and their allies.

Distribution
This marine species occurs on the Lord Howe Rise in the Coral Sea.

References

 Marshall, B.A., 1995. Calliostomatidae (Gastropoda: Trochoidea) from New Caledonia, the Loyalty Islands, and the northern Lord Howe Rise. Mémoires du Muséum national d'Histoire naturelle 167: 381-458

Calliostomatidae